João Ricardo may refer to:

 João Ricardo (footballer, born 1970), João Ricardo Pereira Batalha dos Santos Ferreira, Angolan football goalkeeper
 João Ricardo (footballer, born 1988), João Ricardo Riedi, Brazilian football goalkeeper
 João Ricardo (footballer, born 1991), João Ricardo Pinto da Silva, Portuguese football midfielder